Applied Energetics, Inc. (AERG) specializes in the development and manufacture of advanced high-performance lasers, high-voltage electronics, advanced optical systems, and integrated guided energy systems for defense, aerospace, industrial, and scientific customers worldwide. AERG has developed, successfully demonstrated and holds all crucial intellectual property rights to a dynamic Directed Energy technology called Laser Guided Energy (“LGE®”) and Laser Induced Plasma Channel (“LIPC®”).

LGE and LIPC are technologies that can be used in a new generation of high-tech weapons. The Department of Defense (DOD) previously recognized two key types of Directed Energy Weapon (“DEW”) technologies, High Energy Lasers (“HEL”), and High-Power Microwave (“HPM”). Neither the HEL nor the HPM intellectual property portfolio is owned by a single entity. The DOD then designated a third DEW technology, LGE. Applied Energetics’s LGE and LIPC technologies are wholly owned by Applied Energetics and patent protected with 26 current patents and an additional 11 Government Sensitive Patent Applications (“GSPA”). These GSPA’s are held under secrecy orders of the US government and allow the company greatly extended protection rights. 

Applied Energetics technology is vastly different from conventional directed energy weapons, i.e. HEL, and HPM. LGE uses Ultra-Short Pulse (USP) laser technology to combine the speed and precision of lasers with the overwhelming impact on targeted threats with high-voltage electricity. This unique directed energy solution allows extremely high peak power and energy, with target and effects tenability, and is effective against a wide variety of potential targets. A key element of LGE is its novel ability to offer selectable and tunable properties that can help protect non-combatants and combat zone infrastructure. 

As Applied Energetics looks toward the future, our corporate strategic roadmap builds upon the significant value of the company’s USP capabilities and key intellectual property, including LGE and LIPC, to offer our prospective partners, co-developers and system integrators a variety of next-generation Ultra Short-Pulse and frequency-agile optical sources from the ultraviolet to the far infrared portion of the electromagnetic spectrum to address numerous challenges within the military, medical device, and advanced manufacturing market sectors.

References

Defense companies of the United States